David E. Weinstein II (born 1964) is an American economist. Since 1999, he has served as the Carl S. Shoup Professor of Japanese Economy at Columbia University. Before teaching at Columbia, Weinstein taught at University of Michigan and Harvard University. He also served on the Council of Economic Advisers from 1989 to 1990.

Education
BA, economics, Yale University, 1985
MA, economics, University of Michigan, 1988 
PhD, economics, University of Michigan, 1991

References

University of Michigan College of Literature, Science, and the Arts alumni
Yale College alumni
Columbia Business School faculty
United States Council of Economic Advisers
Living people
1964 births
20th-century American economists
University of Michigan faculty
Harvard University faculty
21st-century American economists